Tiar Aliet is a payam in Boncuai Rup County, in Aweil , now NBG State, South Sudan. It's the first most populous Town in Boncuai Community followed by Panthou

Demographics
Tiar-aleit is composed of two bomas: Mangar Lual and Tiar-aleit.  According to the Fifth Population and Housing Census of Sudan, conducted in April 2008, Tiar-aleit had a combined population of 10,683 people, composed of 4,747 male and 5,936 female residents.

Notes

References 

Geography of South Sudan
Subdivisions of South Sudan